Robin Weigert (born July 7, 1969) is an American television and film actress. She is best known for portraying Calamity Jane on the television series Deadwood (2004–2006), for which she received a nomination for the Primetime Emmy Award for Outstanding Supporting Actress in a Drama Series in 2004, Ally Lowen in Sons of Anarchy (2010–2013), Dr. Amanda Reisman in Big Little Lies (2017-2019), and Abby in Concussion (2013).

Early life and education
Weigert was born in Washington, D.C., the daughter of Dionne Laufman and Berlin-born Wolfgang Oscar Weigert, a psychiatrist. She is Jewish. After graduating from Brandeis University in 1991, Weigert attended  New York University, earning a Master of Fine Arts degree in the Graduate Acting Program at the Tisch School of the Arts.

Career 
After a decade as a stage actress based in New York City, she moved to Los Angeles and has appeared in various films, television shows and mini-series.

Her theatre work includes Broadway productions of Twelfth Night directed by Nicholas Hytner; and Michael Frayn’s Noises Off. In the 2010 Signature Theater Company revival of Tony Kushner’s Angels in America, directed by Michael Greif, her performance as the Angel was praised as ‘full of tenderness and wit’ by USA Today. Other theatre credits include Pride's Crossing, A Place at the Table, Hamlet, Arms and the Man, Goodnight Children Everywhere, The Seagull, Madame Melville (Drama Desk and Lucille Lortel Award nominations), as well as Jon Robin Baitz's Other Desert Cities at the Mark Taper Forum in 2012, directed by Robert Egan.

Weigert is best known for her much-lauded portrayal of Calamity Jane in the HBO television series Deadwood, which ran from 2004 to 2006. In 2004, Weigert was nominated for an Emmy for Outstanding Supporting Actress in a Drama Series for the role. In 2006, she won Hollywood Life magazine's "Breakthrough of the Year" award. In 2019 she reprised the role in Deadwood: The Movie, which was nominated for 8 Emmy Awards, including Outstanding Television Movie.

In 2010 she joined the cast of the FX drama Sons of Anarchy as the motorcycle club's lawyer. In 2014, she played a recurring role as Erica Gradishar on the NBC series Chicago P.D. Beginning in 2017, she appeared on the HBO series Big Little Lies as Dr. Amanda Reisman, sharing scenes with Alexander Skarsgård and Nicole Kidman. She has also appeared in Ryan Murphy and Brad Falchuk's anthology FX series American Horror Story.

Bibliography
The Whip (2012, as audiobook narrator)

Filmography

Film

Television

References

External links

1969 births
American film actresses
American television actresses
Brandeis University alumni
Jewish American actresses
Living people
Tisch School of the Arts alumni
Actresses from Washington, D.C.
20th-century American actresses
21st-century American actresses
American people of German-Jewish descent